The 1929 St. Louis Cardinals season was the team's 48th season in St. Louis, Missouri and the 38th season in the National League. The Cardinals went 78–74 during the season and finished 4th in the National League.

Offseason 
 December 13, 1928: Tommy Thevenow was traded by the Cardinals to the Philadelphia Phillies for Heinie Sand and $10,000.

Regular season

Season standings

Record vs. opponents

Roster

Player stats

Batting

Starters by position 
Note: Pos = Position; G = Games played; AB = At bats; H = Hits; Avg. = Batting average; HR = Home runs; RBI = Runs batted in

Other batters 
Note: G = Games played; AB = At bats; H = Hits; Avg. = Batting average; HR = Home runs; RBI = Runs batted in

Pitching

Starting pitchers 
Note: G = Games pitched; IP = Innings pitched; W = Wins; L = Losses; ERA = Earned run average; SO = Strikeouts

Other pitchers 
Note: G = Games pitched; IP = Innings pitched; W = Wins; L = Losses; ERA = Earned run average; SO = Strikeouts

Relief pitchers 
Note: G = Games pitched; W = Wins; L = Losses; SV = Saves; ERA = Earned run average; SO = Strikeouts

Farm system 

LEAGUE CHAMPIONS: Rochester

References

External links
1929 St. Louis Cardinals at Baseball Reference
1929 St. Louis Cardinals  at Baseball Almanac

St. Louis Cardinals seasons
Saint Louis Cardinals season
St Louis